Jose Mendoza may refer to:

 José Mendoza (Honduran footballer) (born 1989), Honduran football player
 Jose C. Mendoza (born 1947), 168th Associate Justice of the Supreme Court of the Philippines of the Supreme Court of the Philippines
 José Julio Mendoza (born 1988), Mexican boxer
 Jose M. Mendoza, Filipino sculptor
 Jose Mendoza Lopez (1910–2005), Mexican and United States Army soldier who won the Medal of Honor
 José Mendoza Perdomo (born 1993), Mexican volleyball player
 José Mendoza (Peruvian footballer) (born 1982), Peruvian football player
 José Mendoza, a character in the manga and anime series Ashita no Joe